Prior to the 2015 election Barrie was a federal  electoral district in Ontario, Canada, that has been represented in the House of Commons of Canada since 2004.  It consisted of the City of Barrie in the County of Simcoe. It was created in 2003 when its predecessor, Barrie—Simcoe—Bradford, was redistributed. Barrie—Simcoe—Bradford consisted of the City of Barrie and the towns of Bradford West Gwillimbury and Innisfil. It had been formed in 1996 as Barrie—Simcoe from Simcoe Centre and York—Simcoe ridings, but its name was changed before an election was held.

Members of Parliament

Adjacent ridings

 Simcoe North
 Simcoe—Grey
 York—Simcoe

Future

For the 2015 federal election, the city of Barrie was split into two new electoral districts, the north half became part of Barrie—Springwater—Oro-Medonte, whereas the south half became part of Barrie—Innisfil.

The Barrie—Innisfil federal electoral district consists of:

(a) that part of the County of Simcoe comprising the Town of Innisfil; and
(b) that part of the City of Barrie lying southerly of a line described as follows: commencing at the intersection of the westerly limit of said city with Dunlop Street West; thence northeasterly along said street to Tiffin Street; thence southeasterly and easterly along said street to Lakeshore Drive; thence northeasterly in a straight line to the easterly limit of said city (at the intersection of the southerly limit of the Township of Oro-Medonte with the northerly limit of the Town of Innisfil).

The Barrie—Springwater—Oro-Medonte federal electoral district consists of:

(a) that part of the County of Simcoe comprising
(i) the Township of Springwater;
(ii) that part of the Township of Oro-Medonte lying southwesterly of a line described as follows: commencing at the intersection of the northwesterly limit of said township with 9 Line North; thence southeasterly along said line to Moonstone Road East; thence northeasterly along said road to 9 Line North; thence generally southeasterly along said line to Horseshoe Valley Road East; thence northeasterly along said road to 9 Line North; thence southeasterly along said line, its intermittent production, 9 Line South and its southeasterly production to the southerly limit of said township; and
(b) that part of the City of Barrie lying northerly of a line described as follows: commencing at the intersection of the westerly limit of said city with Dunlop Street West; thence northeasterly along said street to Tiffin Street; thence southeasterly and easterly along said street to Lakeshore Drive; thence northeasterly in a straight line to the easterly limit of said city (at the intersection of the southerly limit of the Township of Oro-Medonte with the northerly limit of the Town of Innisfil).

Election results

Barrie—Simcoe—Bradford (1997-2004)

See also
 List of Canadian federal electoral districts
 Past Canadian electoral districts

References

Riding history from the Library of Parliament
Expenditures
2011 Results from Elections Canada

Notes

External links
Barrie Conservative EDA
Barrie Green Party
Barrie Liberal Riding Associations
Barrie New Democratic Party

Former federal electoral districts of Ontario
Politics of Barrie